Janet Guthrie (born March 7, 1938) is a retired professional race car driver and the first woman to qualify and compete in both the Indianapolis 500 and the Daytona 500, both in 1977. She had first attempted to enter the Indianapolis 500 in 1976 but failed to qualify. She raced in three Indy 500s: 1977-79. She was also the first woman to lead a lap in the NASCAR Winston Cup Series. Guthrie was originally an aerospace engineer, and after graduating from the University of Michigan with a physics degree in 1960, she worked with Republic Aviation.

Racing career
Guthrie began racing in 1963 on the SCCA circuit in a Jaguar XK140 and by 1972, she was racing on a full-time basis. Her sportscar racing career included two class wins in the famed 12 Hours of Sebring endurance race.

In the 1976 World 600, Guthrie finished 15th, becoming the first woman to compete in a NASCAR Winston Cup superspeedway race. Guthrie would go on to compete in four more races that season. The following season, she competed in her first Daytona 500, finishing 12th when her car's engine blew two cylinders with ten laps to go. For her performance in the race, though, she still earned the honor of Top Rookie. Overall, Guthrie went on to compete in 33 races in NASCAR over four seasons. Her highest finish, sixth place at Bristol in 1977, is the best finish by a woman in a top-tier NASCAR race, now currently tied with Danica Patrick in 2014.

Guthrie qualified for and competed in the 1977 Indianapolis 500, in a car entered by Rolla Vollstedt, but finished 29th with engine troubles. She would compete in two more Indy 500s, finishing ninth in the 1978 race while driving with a fractured wrist (injured in a charity tennis event two days earlier) she hid from race officials. Overall, she competed in 11 Indy car events with a best finish of fifth. During her unsuccessful bid to qualify for the 1976 race, many of the drivers in the male-dominated sport stated that the reason she did not qualify was mainly due to her gender. These comments angered then three-time champion A. J. Foyt to the point he lent Guthrie a back-up car to conduct a shake-down test. Her top practice lap in Foyt's car would have been adequate to qualify for the field. She was unable to obtain funding through corporate sponsorship, and was forced into retirement.

Nevertheless, Guthrie's place in history was secure. In 1979, the Supersisters trading card set was produced and distributed; one of the cards featured Guthrie's name and picture. Guthrie's helmet and race suit can be found in the Smithsonian Institution and she was one of the first elected to the International Women's Sports Hall of Fame. She was inducted into the International Motorsports Hall of Fame on April 27, 2006. Her 2005 autobiography, Janet Guthrie: A Life at Full Throttle, has received critical praise from such publications as Sports Illustrated.

Battling sexism in motorsports
In a groundbreaking interview with Tracy Dodds for the Los Angeles Times in 1987, Guthrie lamented the lack of corporate sponsorships for female drivers:

The struggle for women drivers to secure corporate sponsorships continues today. When Pippa Mann lacked the funding to enter the Indianapolis 500 in 2020 despite driving the previous year, the 2020 race was left with no women drivers. Guthrie said she was unlikely to watch the 2020 race due to her disappointment. Guthrie herself initially said she was hesitant to address sexism in motorsports, but her mindset changed after she qualified for her first Indy 500 in 1977 and was part of the downtown parade. As Guthrie described, “There were these guys who had little girls on their shoulders and were sort of waving these little girls as if I represented hope for the future."

In 2011, Guthrie signed a petition in support of the right of women in Saudi Arabia to drive. The petition called on Saudi King Abdullah to sponsor a Saudi Women's Grand Prix. The project was the idea of human rights activist David Keyes.

Qualified, an episode of ESPN 30 for 30 covering her racing career, aired on May 28, 2019 (Volume III, Episode 29). In it, she says, "You can go back to antiquity to find women doing extraordinary things, but their history is forgotten. Or denied to have ever existed. So women keep reinventing the wheel. Women have always done these things, and they always will."

In 2019, Guthrie was inducted into the Automotive Hall of Fame. for her achievements in motorsports. She is the 5th woman to be inducted.

Personal life
Guthrie was born in Iowa City, Iowa to Jean Ruth Guthrie (née Midkiff) and William Lain Guthrie, both pilots. She is the oldest of five children. Her family moved to Miami, Florida when Janet was three years old after her father accepted a job with Eastern Air Lines. Janet herself earned her pilot's license at 17 years old.

Guthrie married Warren Levine, a charter airline pilot, in 1989. He died on December 30, 2006, of a sudden heart attack.

Motorsports career results

NASCAR
(key) (Bold – Pole position awarded by qualifying time. Italics – Pole position earned by points standings or practice time. * – Most laps led.)

Winston Cup Series

American open–wheel racing results

Indianapolis 500

References

External links
Official web site
nascar.com feature article
Driver's statistics at racing-reference.info
Guthrie's career data in NASCAR

Living people
1938 births
Sportspeople from Iowa City, Iowa
Racing drivers from Iowa
Indianapolis 500 drivers
NASCAR drivers
American Speed Association drivers
Trans-Am Series drivers
International Motorsports Hall of Fame inductees
University of Michigan College of Engineering alumni
American female racing drivers
Female IndyCar Series drivers
21st-century American women